Clinidium trionyx is a species of ground beetle in the subfamily Rhysodinae. It was described by R.T. & J.R. Bell in 1985. It is known from Cazabita in the Dominican Republic.

References

Clinidium
Beetles of North America
Insects of the Dominican Republic
Endemic fauna of the Dominican Republic
Beetles described in 1985